The Samsung Galaxy Feel is an Android smartphone developed by Samsung Electronics exclusively for the Japanese market. The phone was released in June 2017 and was sold by NTT Docomo. It runs on Android 7.0 (Nougat), has a 4.7 inch display, and a 3000 mAh battery.

Specifications

Software
Samsung Galaxy Feel runs on Android 7.0 (Nougat), but can be later updated to Android 8.0 (Oreo).

Hardware
Samsung Galaxy Feel has a 4.7 inch Super AMOLED HD display, 16 MP back facing and 5 MP front facing cameras. It has a 3000 mAh battery, a 1.6 GHz Octa-Core ARM Cortex-A53 CPU, and an ARM Mali-T830 MP1 700 MHz GPU. It comes with 32GB of internal storage, expandable to 256GB via microSD.

Aside from its software and hardware specifications, Samsung also introduced a unique a hole in the phone's shell to accommodate the Japanese perceived penchant for personalizing their mobile phones. The Galaxy Feel's battery was also touted as a major selling point since the market favors handsets with longer battery life. The device is also waterproof and supports 1seg digital broadcasts using an antenna that is sold separately.

History
Samsung Galaxy Feel was announced May 2017 and released June of the same year.

References

Samsung Galaxy
Mobile phones introduced in 2017